The 2011 Tianjin Teda F.C. season involved Tianjin competing in the Chinese Super League, Chinese FA Cup, and AFC Champions League. Tianjin qualified for the AFC Champions League after finishing runners-up the 2010 Chinese Super League.

Players

Competitions

Chinese Super League

Chinese FA Cup

AFC Champions League

Group stage

Tiebreakers
Gamba Osaka and Tianjin Teda are ranked by their head-to-head records, as shown below.

Knock-out stage

References

Tianjin Jinmen Tiger F.C. seasons
Tianjin Teda F.C.